Óscar Gil Regaño (born 26 April 1998) is a Spanish professional footballer who plays as a right-back for La Liga club Espanyol and the Spain national team.

Club career

Elche
Born in Elche, Valencian Community, Gil represented CD Pablo Iglesias, Elche CF and Kelme CF as a youth. He made his senior debut with Elche's reserve team on 23 August 2015, starting in a 1–0 Tercera División away win against FC Jove Español San Vicente.

Gil subsequently struggled with injuries in the following campaigns, only becoming a regular starter for the B-side during the 2017–18 campaign. He made his professional debut on 16 October 2018, starting in a 4–1 home defeat to Córdoba CF, for the season's Copa del Rey.

Gil made his Segunda División debut on 24 August 2019, starting in a 2–1 away defeat of AD Alcorcón, and subsequently became a regular starter under manager Pacheta.

Gil scored his first professional goal on 8 March 2020, netting his team's first in a 3–2 away success over Rayo Vallecano. He contributed with 36 appearances (3,018 minutes, play-offs included) during the campaign, as his side achieved promotion to La Liga.

Espanyol
On 7 September 2020, Gil agreed to a four-year contract with RCD Espanyol, recently relegated from the top tier, after the club activated his €500,000 buyout clause.

International career
Due to the isolation of some national team players following the positive COVID-19 test of Sergio Busquets, Spain's under-21 squad  were called up for the international friendly against Lithuania on 8 June 2021. Gil made his senior debut in the match as Spain won 4–0.

Career statistics

International

Honours
Spain U23
Summer Olympic silver medal: 2020

References

External links
Profile at the RCD Espanyol website

1998 births
Living people
Footballers from Elche
Spanish footballers
Spain under-21 international footballers
Spain international footballers
Association football defenders
Segunda División players
Tercera División players
Elche CF Ilicitano footballers
Elche CF players
RCD Espanyol footballers
Olympic footballers of Spain
Footballers at the 2020 Summer Olympics
Olympic medalists in football
Olympic silver medalists for Spain
Medalists at the 2020 Summer Olympics